Abádszalók is a town in Jász-Nagykun-Szolnok county, in the Northern Great Plain region of central Hungary.
The town was established in 1895 by the union of the villages of Tiszabad and Tiszalok.

Geography

History

The Jewish community
Jews settled in the city in the 19th century. And in 1880 there were 112 Jews in the community.
In 1920, the city's Jews were victims of a pogrom.
In 1940, only 18 Jewish families lived there.
In March 1944, the Jews were concentrated in the Szolnok ghetto and from there most of them were sent to the Auschwitz extermination camp.

Tourism
 Lake Tisza
The biggest tourist attraction in Abádszalók is the Lake Tisza. Water-skiing, boating, and kayaking as well as discos and concerts are available. Lake Tisza has waterfowls, water fauna and aquatic activities.

International relations
Abádszalók is twinned with:

 Păsăreni (Backamadaras), Romania; since 2006
 Rzepiennik Strzyżewski, Poland; since 1999

See also
 Tonuzoba

References

Dante Mena: Adventure Guide to Hungary. Hunter Travel Guides 2007, p. 558

External links

  in Hungarian

Populated places in Jász-Nagykun-Szolnok County
Jewish communities destroyed in the Holocaust